Józef Makary Potocki (died 1829) was a Polish nobleman (szlachcic).

Józef was owner of Monastyryska estates. He became starost of Halych and Czorsztyn. Knight of the Order of the White Eagle, awarded on May 1, 1792.

He married Elżbieta Marianna Wielopolska (ca. 1747-1771) in 1767 and Ludwika Lubomirska in an unknown year. He had five children with Lubomirska: , Wiktoria Potocka, Elzbieta Potocka, Antoni Potocki and Ludwika Potocka.

18th-century births
1829 deaths
Jozef Makary
Starost of Halych